Mong Khat Township (also(Approved)" Mong Khat) is a town in  Kengtong District of Shan State of Myanmar. The town is located alongside the Nam Loi Creek, a tributary of the Mekong. The nearest airport is 51 miles away  in Kengtong.

Notes

External links
"Wan Singpyin Map — Satellite Images of Wan Singpyin" Maplandia World Gazetteer
Wan Singpyin
Mong Khat

Populated places in Shan State